Sinong Kapiling? Sinong Kasiping? is a 1977 award-winning Filipino romantic musical drama directed by Eddie Romero.

The film picked up two Gawad Urian Awards, Daria Ramirez winning best actress and Lito Legaspi best supporting actor in 1978.

Plot

Cast
Gloria Diaz
Rosemarie Gil
Lito Legaspi
Daria Ramirez
Mat Ranillo III
Vic Vargas

External links
 

1977 films
Philippine musical films
Philippine romantic drama films
Tagalog-language films
1977 romantic drama films
Philippine romantic musical films
Films directed by Eddie Romero
1970s romantic musical films